Filipe Joaquim Gonçalves Andrade Ponce de Leão (born 13 November 1983 in Lisbon) is a Portuguese former professional footballer who played as a goalkeeper.

References

External links

1983 births
Living people
Footballers from Lisbon
Portuguese footballers
Association football goalkeepers
Liga Portugal 2 players
Segunda Divisão players
C.F. Estrela da Amadora players
S.C. Farense players
F.C. Marco players
C.D. Mafra players
Atlético Clube de Portugal players
G.D. Estoril Praia players
C.D. Fátima players
Clube Oriental de Lisboa players
S.C.U. Torreense players
S.U. Sintrense players
GS Loures players